Articles with hCards

Laininghan Naoriya Phulo (born 28 August 1888) was a Meitei religious, social and political leader and the founder of the antique Meitei religion revivalist school of Apokpa Marup. According to Meitei doctrines, he was regarded as a prophet who was born to preserve and revive the suppressed ancient paganism of the Meitei ethnicity. He is seen as an example for all Meiteis to follow. He invented a modern script (different from the present Meitei Mayek) to write Meitei language and its numerals taking help from the old script which he discovered from the Shakok Salai Thiren, based on the cosmic evolution of the Meitei mythology.
Still today, people celebrate his birthday on the month of Thawan (August) according to Meitei calendar both in Assam and Manipur.

Related pages 

 George Washington

 Swami Vivekananda
 Malcolm X
 Moses
 Muhammad
 Theodor Herzl

Bibliography 

 https://archive.org/details/in.ernet.dli.2015.310092
 https://archive.org/details/in.ernet.dli.2015.465301
 https://books.google.co.in/books?id=aAuKAAAAMAAJ&q=naoriya+phulo&dq=naoriya+phulo&hl=en&sa=X&ved=2ahUKEwidxqnOi93wAhVa4XMBHVc5D0UQ6AEwAnoECAMQAw

References

Other websites 

 http://www.e-pao.net/epSubPageExtractor.asp?src=reviews.books.Laininghan_Naoria_Phulo_The_Prophet_Extracts_From_Sakok_Thiren
 http://www.manipur.org/news/tag/laininghan-naoriya-phulo-charitable-trust/
 https://www.thesangaiexpress.com/Encyc/2019/8/23/Bpr-Tbl-Aug-23-The-131st-birth-anniversary-of-Laininghal-Naoriya-Phulo-was-celebrated-followed-by-an-award-distribution-ceremony-for-successful-students-of-class-X-and-XII-from-Bishnupur-district-a.html
 http://e-pao.net/GP.asp?src=28..270813.aug13
 https://www.sentinelassam.com/north-east-india-news/assam-news/enlightening-discussion-on-manipuri-litterateur-naoria-phulo/
 https://www.imphaltimes.com/news/item/4199-recitation-competition-on-naoria-phulo-s-poem
Meitei people
Pages with unreviewed translations